Elections for the Indian state of Jammu and Kashmir were held in the early months of 1962. Bakshi Ghulam Mohammad was appointed Prime Minister of Jammu and Kashmir.

Background
After the 1957 elections, Bakshi Ghulam Mohammad failed to appoint any member of the G. M. Sadiq-led leftist faction to the Cabinet, leading Sadiq to form a rival Democratic National Conference party. However, in 1960, a reconciliation was brokered by the central government, and the two parties reunited. The reunited party contested the elections in 1962. However, 20 candidates from the rump Democratic National Conference party contested the election.

The other parties contesting the elections were the Jammu Praja Parishad, Praja Socialist Party and Harijan Mandal.

The 1962 elections were the first elections in the state conducted by the Election Commission of India. The earlier elections were held by the State's Franchise Commissioner.

Results
Of the 43 constituencies in the Kashmir Valley, 32 were unopposed. Overall, the National Conference won 41 of the 43 seats in the Valley.

In the Jammu Division, the National Conference won 27 of the 30 seats (two of which were unopposed). The remaining three seats went to the Praja Parishad.

In the Ladakh Division, all two seats were won by the National Conference. The Ladakh seat was won by the Head Llama Kushak Bakula.

After the elections, the Praja Parishad held a mass demonstration in the Jammu city, joined by the Praja Socialist Party and the Akali Dal, citing electoral malpractices. Bakshi Ghulam Mohammad dismissed the complaints as "frivolous".

Elected members

Aftermath
Bakshi Ghulam Mohammad was increasingly seen in New Delhi as an embarrassment as he arranged most seats to be elected unopposed. In 1963, he was forced to step down, and Khwaja Shamsuddin was elected as the Chief Minister. Bakshi ensured that his rival G. M. Sadiq could not be appointed. The Shamsuddin government again excluded Sadiq his colleagues from Cabinet appointments.

In December 1963, the pent-up anger of the populace erupted over a stolen religious relic from the Srinagar's Hazratbal Mosque. Even though the relic was subsequently recovered, the people did not trust the government and continued the agitation. In the fall-out, Shamsuddin lost his post, and G. M. Sadiq was appointed as the Chief Minister in February 1965.

References

Bibliography
 
 

Jammu and Kashmir
1962
1962